The Wilmot Power Station is a conventional hydroelectric power station located in north-western Tasmania, Australia.

Technical details
Part of the MerseyForth run-of-river hydro scheme that comprises seven hydroelectric power stations, the Wilmot Power Station is the fourth station in the scheme. The power station is located on the foreshore of Lake Cethana. Water is then discharged from the station into Lake Cethana.

The power station was commissioned in 1971 by the Hydro Electric Corporation (TAS).

The station output, estimated to be  annually, is fed to TasNetworks' transmission grid via an 11 kV/220 kV Siemens generator transformer to the outdoor switchyard.

See also

 List of power stations in Tasmania

References

Hydroelectric power stations in Tasmania
Northern Tasmania
Energy infrastructure completed in 1971